Borki  is a village in Radzyń Podlaski County, Lublin Voivodeship, in eastern Poland. It is the seat of the gmina (administrative district) called Gmina Borki.

References

Villages in Radzyń Podlaski County
Lublin Voivodeship (1474–1795)
Siedlce Governorate
Lublin Governorate
Lublin Voivodeship (1919–1939)